Sabine Sebrowski (née Kärgel; born 28 April 1951) is a German athlete. She competed in the women's javelin throw at the 1976 Summer Olympics, where she finished in fifth place.

References

External links
 

1951 births
Living people
People from Crivitz
German female javelin throwers
Sportspeople from Mecklenburg-Western Pomerania
Olympic athletes of East Germany
Athletes (track and field) at the 1976 Summer Olympics